Google Sites is a structured wiki and web page creation tool included as part of the free, web-based Google Docs Editors suite offered by Google. The service also includes Google Docs, Google Sheets, Google Slides, Google Drawings, Google Forms, and Google Keep. Google Sites is only available as a web application. The app allows users to create and edit files online while collaborating with other users in real-time.

History 
Google Sites started out as JotSpot, the name and sole product of a software company that offered enterprise social software. It was targeted mainly at small-sized and medium-sized businesses. The company was founded by Joe Kraus and Graham Spencer, co-founders of Excite.

In February 2006, JotSpot was named part of Business 2.0, "Next Net 25", and in May 2006, it was honored as one of InfoWorld's "15 Start-ups to Watch". In October 2006, JotSpot was acquired by Google. Google announced a prolonged data transition of webpages created using Google Page Creator (also known as "Google Pages") to Google Sites servers in 2007. On February 28, 2008, Google Sites was unveiled using the JotSpot technology. The service was free, but users needed a domain name, which Google offered for $10. However, as of May 21, 2008, Google Sites became available for free, separately from Google Apps, and without the need for a domain.

In June 2016, Google introduced a complete rebuild of the Google Sites platform, named the New Google Sites, along with transition schedule from Classic Google Sites. The new Google Sites does not use JotSpot technology.

In August 2020, the new Google Sites became the default option for website creation, while in November 2021, all websites made with classic Google Sites were archived.

Censorship 
Following a Turkish regional court ruling in 2009, all pages hosted on Google Sites were blocked in Turkey after it was alleged that one of the pages contained an insult of Turkey's founder, Mustafa Kemal Atatürk. In 2012, the European Court of Human Rights (ECHR) ruled the blockage a breach of Article 10 of the European Convention on Human Rights (Yildirim v Turkey, 2012). The blockage was lifted in 2014.

References

Proprietary wiki software
Sites
Web applications
Free web hosting services
Wiki farms
Sites
Companies' terms of service
2006 mergers and acquisitions